Georgia competed in the Junior Eurovision Song Contest 2021 in Paris, France. The children's talent show  was used for the fourth year in a row to select Georgia's representative, Niko Kajaia, who performed at the contest with the song "Let's Count the Smiles". He finished 4th place out of 19 participating countries.

Background 

In the 2020 contest, Sandra Gadelia represented Georgia with the song "You Are Not Alone" following her victory in the third season of Ranina, achieving 6th place out of 12 with 111 points.

Before Junior Eurovision

Ranina 
Georgian broadcaster GPB confirmed that  would be used for the fourth time on 2 September 2021, confirming that the show would begin on 11 September at 10pm GST. The list of participants competing in the show was revealed on 6 September 2021, confirming that the show would once again have 10 competitors.

Round 1 (11–12 September 2021) 

The jurors for this round were Elene Kalandadze, Davit Evgenidze and Nukri Kapanadze.

Round 2 (18–25 September 2021) 
The jurors for this round were Sopho Toroshelidze, Davit Evgenidze and Paata Godziashvili.

Round 3 (14-16 October 2021) 

The jurors for this round were Maia Mikaberidze, Davit Evgenidze and Giorgi Sikharulidze.

Round 4 (20-23 October 2021) 

The jurors for this round were Sopho Gelovani, Davit Evgenidze and Liza Bagrationi.

At the end of Show 8, the semi-finalists were announced. The five participants who collected the most points throughout the four tours advanced to the next round. They are Nikoloz Kajaia, Keso Rusia, Gega Shonia, Guga Nadiradze, Datuna Luarsabishvili and Barbare Makhatadze. Datuna Luarsabishvili and Barbare Makhatadze both took 5th place with the same score. This means that Ranina will have 6 semi-finalists for the first time.

Semi-final (6 November 2021) 
The jurors for the Semi-final were Tika Rukhadze, Davit Evgenidze and Buka Kartozia.

Final (13 November 2021) 
The jurors for the Final were Sopho Khalvashi, Davit Evgenidze and Beka Gochiashvili.

After the solo performances, all three participants performed the song "Khelebi" (ხელები) together with the Gori Girls Choir.

The day after the final was broadcast, the song "Let's Count The Smiles", with which Niko Kajaia would represent Georgia in the Junior Eurovision Song Contest 2021, was released along with a music video. The song was written by Giga Kukhianidze, and contains lyrics in Georgian, English, and French.

At Junior Eurovision
After the opening ceremony, which took place on 13 December 2021, it was announced that Georgia would perform second on 19 December 2021, following Germany and preceding Poland.

At the end of the contest, Georgia received 163 points, placing 4th out of 19 participating countries.

Performance 
Niko Kajaia was accompanied on stage by two dances, Barbare Tvarava and Lizi Kvirkevlia. The three are dressed in primary colours, with colourful shapes shown on the LED screens behind them.

Voting

Detailed voting results

Notes

References 

Junior Eurovision Song Contest
Georgia
2021